Jamie Valeri Neushul  (born May 12, 1995) is an American water polo player who is a member of the United States women's national water polo team. She became world champion at the 2017 World Aquatics Championships and was a member of the team at the 2017 Summer Universiade, 2017 FINA Women's Water Polo World League, 2018 FINA Women's Water Polo World Cup, 2019 Pan American Games, and 2019 FINA Women's Water Polo World League. She will be part of the team in the women's water polo tournament at the 2020 Summer Olympics.

References 

1993 births
American female water polo players
Living people
Pan American Games medalists in water polo
Pan American Games gold medalists for the United States
Water polo players at the 2019 Pan American Games
Medalists at the 2019 Pan American Games
Water polo players at the 2020 Summer Olympics
Medalists at the 2020 Summer Olympics
Olympic gold medalists for the United States in water polo